Virgílio Marques Mendes (17 November 1926 – 24 April 2009) was a Portuguese professional footballer, noticed as a leading figure of FC Porto and the Portugal national team during the 1950s.

Career
He won the national Primeira Divisão championship title twice with FC Porto, in the 1955–56 and 1958–59 seasons. For the national team, Virgílio debuted in a friendly 1–4 loss to Italy on 27 February 1949, in a game that earned him the nickname of "O Leão de Génova" (The Lion of Genoa), for whom he would be known for the rest of his career.

He was a constant figure in the national team for the next 11 years, and he played in the 1950, 1954 and 1958 World Cup qualification. The last one is remembered for the historical 3–0 win over Italy, which ultimately resulted in the Italians missing the 1958 FIFA World Cup to Northern Ireland, the only time the Italians have missed a World Cup tournament. Virgílio's last game came at age 33, in the Euro 1960 1–5 quarter-final loss to Yugoslavia, on 22 May 1960. That would be his 39th cap for the national team, which made Virgílio the most capped Portuguese football player of his time.

He coached FC Porto for a brief period in 1966 as a caretaker, when he succeeded Flávio Costa in his second stint with the club. He also managed SC Mirandela in the 1979–80 season, leading the team to the first place of the Terceira Divisão – Série A.

Career statistics

Club
Appearances and goals by club, season and competition.

Honours

Player
Porto
Primeira Divisão: 1955–56, 1958–59
Taça de Portugal: 1955–56, 1957–58

Manager
Mirandela
Terceira Divisão – Série A: 1979–80

See also
List of one-club men

References

Further reading
DIAS, Rui, Record – 100 Melhores do Futebol Português – Volume II, 2002, EDISPORT.

External links

1926 births
2009 deaths
Portuguese footballers
Primeira Liga players
FC Porto players
Portugal international footballers
Association football defenders
FC Porto managers
People from Entroncamento
Sportspeople from Santarém District